Josh Byrnes (born April 18, 1974) is a Republican party member of the Iowa House of Representatives.

Byrnes received his undergraduate education at Luther College and has a master's degree from Winona State University.  He was a high school teacher and community college instructor before entering politics.

As of January 2013, Byrnes served on several committees in the Iowa House – the Education, Natural Resources, and Ways and Means committees, as well as the Education Appropriations budget subcommittee. He served as the Chair of the Transportation committee.

Byrnes was first elected to the Iowa House of Representatives in 2010.

Biography
Byrnes was born in Oelwein, Iowa. He grew up in Riceville, Iowa, where he graduated from Riceville Community High School in 1992. He went on to graduate from Luther College, earned a master's degree from Winona State University, and is currently completing his doctoral work at Iowa State University.

Byrnes was a high school teacher for eight and a half years and also served as an administrator at the community college level. Byrnes has taught or coached in the districts of Denison, Osage, Riceville, Mason City, St. Ansgar, and Clear Lake.

Josh currently resides on an acreage in Mitchell County with his wife, Colleen, daughters, Alexandra and Scarlett, and son, Nolan. Colleen is a family nurse practitioner at the Mitchell County Regional Hospital and has received numerous prestigious awards for her work. The family enjoys their acreage where they have a small cow calf herd, raise gourds and play ball on their diamond.

Electoral history
*incumbent

References

External links

 Iowa legislature bio of Byrnes
 Iowa Republicans bio of Byrnes

1974 births
Living people
Luther College (Iowa) alumni
Republican Party members of the Iowa House of Representatives
People from Osage, Iowa
People from Riceville, Iowa
21st-century American politicians